Sainte-Germaine-Boulé is a municipality in northwestern Quebec, Canada, in the Abitibi-Ouest Regional County Municipality.

The municipality was incorporated on January 1, 1954.

History
Sainte-Germaine-Boulé was first settled in 1922 when the family of Noël Boucher and Marie Couillard moved in. The sector was still part of the municipality of Palmarolle at the time. The municipality started in 1932 with the arrival of the family of Roméo Drouin, his brother Amédée Drouin and their parents Louis Drouin and Démérise Beaudoin. One year later a visit of Mgr Rhéaume was organized to fix the location of a future church.

The sector continued to develop at a steady pace until 1954 when it officially became its own separate municipality from Palmarolle as well as by gaining territory from the nearby Poularies. The original name of the new municipality was Sainte-Germaine-de-Palmarolle but it was changed to Sainte-Germaine-Boulé five months later.

Demographics
Population trend:
 Population in 2016: 986 (2011 to 2016 population change: 10.2%)
 Population in 2011: 895 (2006 to 2011 population change: -5.0%)
 Population in 2006: 942
 Population in 2001: 1005
 Population in 1996: 1076
 Population in 1991: 1118

Private dwellings occupied by usual residents: 408 (total dwellings: 421)

Mother tongue:
 English as first language: 0%
 French as first language: 99%
 English and French as first language: 0.5%
 Other as first language: 0%

Municipal council
 Mayor: Jaclin Bégin
 Councillors: Frédéric Audet, Richard Bisson, Dany Corriveau, Mélanie Morin, Sylvain Rancourt, Carole Samson

References

Municipalities in Quebec
Incorporated places in Abitibi-Témiscamingue
Populated places established in 1932